Notre-Dame-de-Lourdes is a parish municipality in Quebec.

Demographics 

References

Parish municipalities in Quebec
Incorporated places in Centre-du-Québec